= Donna Marcantonio =

American artist

Donna Marcantonio is an American artist. Her work is included in the collections of the Whitney Museum of American Art and the RISD Museum.
